Grover Allen Hartley (July 2, 1888 – October 19, 1964) was a backup catcher in Major League Baseball. From 1911 through 1934, he played for the New York Giants (1911–13, 1924–26), St. Louis Terriers (1914–15), St. Louis Browns (1916–17, 1934), Boston Red Sox (1927) and Cleveland Indians (1930). Hartley batted and threw right-handed. He was born in Osgood, Indiana.

In a 14-season career, Hartley was a .268 hitter with three home runs and 144 RBI in 569 games played.

Hartley was a catcher with good defensive skills as he took responsibility for getting the most out of his pitchers, and worked hard at ensuring their success. He debuted with the New York Giants in 1911, appearing in part of three seasons. In 1914 he jumped to the outlaw Federal League, becoming a regular with the St. Louis Terriers for the next two years, and later shared catching tenures for the St. Louis Browns, Boston Red Sox, Cleveland Indians, and new stints with the Giants and Browns, retiring at the end of the 1934 season. Between his stints with the Browns and Giants, he spent seven years in the minor leagues with the Columbus Senators.

In 1935 Hartley became an American League umpire. He also managed in the minors and coached for the Giants, Browns, Pirates and Indians.

Hartley died in Daytona Beach, Florida, at the age of 76.

Notes

External links

Baseball Reference
Baseball Almanac
Grover Hartley - Baseballbiography.com
Retrosheet

Boston Red Sox players
Cleveland Indians players
New York Giants (NL) players
New York Giants (NL) coaches
St. Louis Browns players
St. Louis Terriers players
Major League Baseball catchers
1888 births
1964 deaths
People from Ripley County, Indiana
St. Louis Browns coaches
Pittsburgh Pirates coaches
Cleveland Indians coaches
Minor league baseball managers
Battle Creek Crickets players
Toledo Mud Hens players
Springfield Senators players
Decatur Commodores players
Columbus Senators players
Indianapolis Indians players
Louisville Colonels (minor league) players
Findlay Browns players
Findlay Oilers players
Baseball players from Indiana
Lima Chiefs players
Marion Cardinals players
Marion Diggers players